Yasin is a surname and unisex given name of Arabic origin. The name comes from a chapter (surah) of the Quran called Ya-Sin. It is an epithet of the prophet Muhammad. Variants are Yassin, Yaseni, Yassine, Yaseen, Jasin and Yacine.

People with the name include:

Mononym
Yasin (rapper) also known as Yasin Byn, Swedish hip hop artist

Given name
 Yasin Abu Bakr (born Lennox Philip), leader of the Jamaat al Muslimeen, a Muslim group in Trinidad and Tobago
 Yasin Anwar (born 1951), Pakistani-American banker, former Governor of the State Bank of Pakistan
 Yasin Arafat (born 1987), Bangladeshi cricketer
 Yasin Aslan, Turkish author
 Yasin Avcı (footballer born 1983), Turkish footballer
 Yasin Avcı (footballer born 1984), Turkish footballer
 Yasin Aydın (born 1995), Turkish volleyball player
 Yasiin Bey (born 1973), new name of hip hop artist Mos Def
 Yasin Bhatkal, or Mohammed Ahmed Siddibappa, founder leader of the proscribed terrorist organisation Indian Mujahideen
 Yasin Çakmak (born 1985), Turkish footballer
 Yasin Dutton, Professor of Arabic in School of Languages & Literature at the University of Cape Town
 Yasin Ali Egal (born 1991), Somali footballer 
 Yasin Ehliz (born 1992), German ice hockey player
 Yasin Erdal (born 1986), Turkish-Dutch futsal player
 Yasin al-Hashimi (1884–1937), Iraqi politician
 Yasin Hayal (born 1980), Turkish criminal
 Yasin Karaca (1983), Turkish footballer
 Yasin Osman Kenadid (1919–1988), Somali intellectual, writer and linguist
 Yasin Malik (born 1966), Kashmiri separatist leader, advocates the separation of Kashmir from India and Pakistan
 Yasin Haji Mohamoud, Somali politician and Foreign Minister
 Yasin Merchant (born 1966), Indian snooker player
 Yasin Mishaui (born 1975), Bulgarian-Arab footballer 
 Yasin Said Numan (born 1948), Yemeni politician
 Yasin Hassan Omar (born 1983), convicted criminal for his role in the attempted 21 July attacks on London's public transport system
 Yasin Özdenak (born 1948), Turkish footballer
 Yasin Öztekin (born 1987), Turkish-German footballer
 Yasin Öztop (born 1991), Turkish footballer
 Yasin Pehlivan (born 1989), Austrian footballer 
 Yasin Pilavcılar (born 1990), Turkish jockey
 Yasin Salmani (born 2002), Iranian footballer 
 Yasin Sancak (born 1978), Turkish volleyball player
 Yasin Haji Osman Sharmarke, Somali politician and activist
 Yasin Sulaiman (born 1975), Malaysian singer
 Yasin Sülün (born 1977), Turkish footballer and coach
 Yasin Temel (born 1977), Turkish neurosurgeon
 Yasin Wattoo, Pakistani politician and government minister
 Yasin Yılmaz (born 1989), Turkish-German footballer

Surname
 Abdul Rahman Yasin (born 1960), 1993 World Trade Center bomber planner
 Ahmed Yusuf Yasin (born 1957), Vice-President of Somaliland, 2002−2010
 Bilal Yasin (born 1970), Pakistani politician and member of the Provincial Assembly of the Punjab
 Deqa Yasin, Somali politician and government minister
 Hassan Sheheryar Yasin, aka HSY, Pakistani fashion designer and television host
 Iman Khatib-Yasin (born 1964), Israeli Arab social worker and politician
 Ismail Yasin (1912−1972), Egyptian actor and comedian
 Khalid Yasin (born 1946), Islamic activist
 Khalid Yasin [Abdul Aziz] (1940−1978), American jazz organist and pianist known as Larry Young
 Lilah Yasin (born 1957), Malaysian politician
 Mian Hamid Yasin, Pakistani politician, member of the National Assembly of Pakistan
 Mo Yasin, Pakistani squash player
 Mohammad Yasin (cricketer) (born 1992), Pakistani cricketer
 Mohammad Yasin (politician) (born 1971), British politician
 Nabeel Yasin (born 1950), Iraqi poet, journalist and political activist
 Naved Yasin (born 1987), Pakistani cricketer 
 Nurmemet Yasin (c. 1977-reportedly died 2011), Uighur Chinese author 
 Rachmat Yasin (born 1963), or Rahmat Yasin, Indonesian politician
 Rania al Yassin, Queen Rania of Jordan (born 1970), wife of King Abdullah II of Jordan
 Salim Yasin (1937–2016), Syrian economist and politician
 Shadya Yasin, Somali social activist
 Yazid Yasin, Singapore footballer
 Yevgeny Yasin (born 1934), Russian economist and politician
 Yusuf Yasin (1888−1962), Syrian-origin Saudi Arabian politician
 Abdallah ibn Yasin (died 1059), theologian, founder, and first leader of the Almoravid movement and dynasty

See also
Yassin (name)
Yassine (name)
Yacine (name)
Yaşın (surname)
Taha (name)

References

Arabic-language surnames
Arabic masculine given names
Turkish-language surnames
Turkish masculine given names
Pakistani masculine given names